The puna miner (Geositta punensis) is a species of bird in the family Furnariidae. It is found in Argentina, Bolivia, Chile, and Peru. Its natural habitat is subtropical or tropical high-altitude grassland.

References

Geositta
Birds of the Puna grassland
Birds described in 1917
Taxonomy articles created by Polbot